Back Together is the third collaborative studio album by English singers Michael Ball and Alfie Boe. It was released on 8 November 2019 through Decca Records. The album peaked at number two on the UK Albums Chart.

Critical reception
Writing for BroadwayWorld, Amanda Prahl wrote "The excellent rise and flow of the first half of the album is chilled a little by the end, which is a pity. Even with these minor missteps, Back Together is mostly an enjoyable experience by two very distinctive, very talented singers of today."

Commercial performance
On 15 November 2019, the album debuted at number two on the UK Albums Chart behind The Script's Sunsets & Full Moons. Together Again became Michael Ball's tenth Top ten album in the UK and became Alfie Boe's eighth Top ten album in the UK. As of September 2022, the album had sold 214,995 copies in the UK.

Track listing
All songs produced by Nick Patrick.

Charts

Certifications

Release history

References

2019 albums
Albums produced by Nick Patrick (record producer)
Alfie Boe albums
Decca Records albums
Michael Ball albums
Vocal duet albums